Punschkrapfen or Punschkrapferl (punch cake) is a nougat and jam filled sponge cake soaked with rum from Austrian cuisine. Besides the filling, it is similar to the French petit four.

Today, one can find Punschkrapfen in most pastry shops and bakeries in Austria and the Czech Republic.

Composition
It is a cake consisting of either sponge cake or cake crumbs, nougat chocolate and apricot jam. The Cake layers are soaked with rum. The cake is cut into 1-1/2 inch square cubes, covered with so-called Punschglasur (punch icing), a thick pink rum sugar glazing often drizzled with chocolate and a cocktail cherry on top. Nowadays, there are also Punschkrapfen in cylindrical form.

History
It is disputed who made the first Punschkrapfen and where it came from. It may have been introduced to Vienna in the Middle Ages by the Avars, or the Ottoman armies brought the Punschkrapfen to Vienna (the Second Turkish Siege), or it may have been invented by an imperial court confectioner.

Trivia

Robert Menasse suggested satirically that the Punschkrapfen should become the Austrian National Symbol.

See also
Petit four
French Fancy
Buchteln

References

External links
Wiener Punschkrapfen Website

Sponge cakes
Stuffed desserts
Austrian cakes
Foods with jam